International Conference on Mechanical Industrial & Energy Engineering (ICMIEE) is held in Bangladesh every alternate 2 years starting from 2010. The objective of ICMIEE is to present the latest research and results of scientists and researchers. The conference provides opportunities for different area delegates to exchange new ideas and applications experiences face-to-face to establish research relationships.

Technological development can be enhanced through continuous research. The Faculty of Mechanical Engineering, Khulna University of Engineering & Technology organizes International Conference on Mechanical, Industrial and Energy Engineering (ICMIEE). It brings great opportunities for both researchers and industrial communities to meet, discuss and share their research outcomes. This helps develop a bridge among the researchers and the experts of the industry. This conference aims to provide a common platform for the participants throughout the world to exchange their views and share the ideas in the vast field of Mechanical, Industrial and Energy Engineering.

Areas

 Aerodynamics
 Applied Mechanics
 Automation, Mechatronics and Robotics
 Automobile Engineering
 CAD/CAM/CIM
 CFD
 Computational Techniques
 Composite and Smart Materials
 Energy Engineering and Management
 Fatigue and Fracture
 Fluid Mechanics and Machinery
 Fuels and Combustion
 Heat and Mass Transfer
 IC Engines
 Industrial Engineering
 Instrumentation and Control
 Leather Engineering
 Manufacturing and Production Process
 MEMS and Nanotechnology
 Oil and Gas Exploration
 Operations Research and Management
 Pollution and Environmental Engineering
 Quality Management, Quality Engineering
 Refrigeration and Air-conditioning
 Renewable Energy
 Safety and Maintenance
 Supply Chain Management
 Textile Engineering
 Tribology

References

Academic conferences
Control engineering